Isaac Semitoje (born 28 April 1968) is a Nigerian footballer. He played in 21 matches for the Nigeria national football team from 1990 to 1999. He was also named in Nigeria's squad for the 1990 African Cup of Nations tournament.

References

External links
 

1968 births
Living people
Nigerian footballers
Nigeria international footballers
1990 African Cup of Nations players
1994 African Cup of Nations players
Africa Cup of Nations-winning players
Heartland F.C. players
Place of birth missing (living people)
Association football defenders